Michel Lentz (21 May 1820 – 8 September 1893) was a Luxembourg poet. He is best known for having written Ons Hémécht, the national anthem of Luxembourg.

External links
 

Luxembourgian poets
1820 births
1893 deaths
People from Luxembourg City
National anthem writers
Alumni of the Athénée de Luxembourg
Luxembourgian male writers
Male poets
19th-century poets
19th-century Luxembourgian people
19th-century male writers
19th-century Luxembourgian writers